The Kazakhstan blind mole-rat or Ural blind mole-rat (Spalax uralensis) is a species of rodent in the family Spalacidae. It is endemic to Kazakhstan, along the Ural River basin and the flood plains of the Uil, Temir, and Emba rivers. 

Whereas the species inhabits an area approximately 100,000 km2 in size, the International Union for Conservation of Nature (IUCN) describes S. uralensis as rare and its habitat prone to overgrazing. In 1993, Puzachenko's morphometric analysis demonstrated that the species was distinct from the giant blind mole-rat (S. giganteus).

References

Spalax
Mammals of Central Asia
Endemic fauna of Kazakhstan
Rodents of Asia
Mammals described in 1939